Connect2Wiltshire is a demand responsive transport network in southern Wiltshire funded by Wiltshire Council, operating in many places including Calne, Kennet Valley, Mere, the Vale of Pewsey, Wootton Bassett, Malmesbury and the Woodford & Wylye Valleys.

It is an upgraded network combining Wigglybus and other shared taxi networks under one brand. Unlike many bus services, all passengers have to book at least one hour before travelling. It operates standard taxi services also. Unlike standard taxis these are charged at bus rates.

The name was chosen because the council required a new licence to use the name Wigglybus.

Connect2Wiltshire also oversee bus routes 101/102/103 (Devizes to Pewsey), operated since August 2017 by Salisbury Reds. These are ordinary bus routes and do not have to be pre-booked.

See also
List of bus operators of the United Kingdom

References

External links
 

Transport in Wiltshire
Bus operators in Wiltshire
Companies based in Wiltshire
Demand responsive transport in the United Kingdom